Vittoria Schisano (born 11 November 1983 in Pomigliano d'Arco)  is an Italian actress.

Biography
Schisano grew up in Pomigliano d'Arco, in the Neapolitan hinterland. In 1998 she moved to Rome to study acting. After acting for several years in the theater, she made her debut in 2005 in the television film My Son alongside Lando Buzzanca, Caterina Vertova and Giovanni Scifoni. In 2009 she received the award as Best New Actor (fiction and TV section) for the 2008/2009 season [not clear]; in 2010 she reinterpreted the role of Damien in the television series Me and my son - New stories for Commissioner Vivaldi. In the same year she received the award as a revelation actor at the 40th Edition "Day of Europe" at the Capitol.

On 17 November 2011, during an interview published in the magazine Sette del Corriere della Sera, she declared that she had undertaken the path to change her sex, at the end of which she took the name of Vittoria Schisano. She then continued her career as an actress appearing in other films including All, Nothing, Nothing and Outing - Fidanzati per accident.

In February 2016, she became the first woman who has made a gender transition to appear on the cover of the Italian edition of Playboy. On 6 May the same year she participated as godmother at the Ciao Darwin Awards.

Filmography

Films

Television

References

The information in this article is based on its article in Italian.

External links
 
 

Living people
1983 births
Transgender women
Transgender actresses
21st-century Italian actresses
Italian transgender people
Italian LGBT actors